Beardmore Precision Motorcycles was a British motorcycle manufacturer formed in 1919 when the engine manufacturer F.E. Baker Ltd, who produced motorcycle and cyclecar engines under the 'Precision' trademark before World War I, entered into an arrangement with the large shipbuilding and engineering company William Beardmore and Company.

History
F.E. Baker Ltd had developed a substantial business making motorcycle and cyclecar engines supplied solely to manufacturers of completed vehicles. The engines were predominantly single and V-twin 4-strokes, with air or water cooling, though just before the war they had added a 2-stroke to their engine line-up. They also had a thriving export business, especially to Australia. During World War I production halted, and many of the small producers of motorcycles and cyclecars had ceased to exist, and after the war the company was faced with financing a restart.

In 1919 F.E. Baker Ltd entered into an arrangement with William Beardmore and Company, a large Scottish engineering and shipbuilding company based in Glasgow and between 1921 and 1924 Beardmore produced motorcycles under the name "Beardmore Precision". The first motorcycle produced was a 350 cc two-stroke featuring leaf-spring suspension front and rear and was followed by a range of motorcycles from 250 cc to 600 cc.

After 1924 Baker regained the rights and started his set up his own company to continue production with Villiers engines of between 147 and 342 cc in Alvechurch Road, Birmingham  The company was eventually sold to the James Cycle Co in 1930. Frank Baker became a James employee and they used his designs well into the 1930s.

Models

See also
William Beardmore and Company
London Motorcycle Museum

References

External links

 Beardmore Precision advert
 1923 Beardmore Precision 250cc
 Beardmore Precision gallery
 

Defunct motorcycle manufacturers of the United Kingdom
Defunct motor vehicle manufacturers of England
Defunct companies based in Birmingham, West Midlands
Manufacturing companies based in Birmingham, West Midlands